WBIB may refer to:

 WBIB (AM), a radio station (1110 AM) licensed to serve Centreville, Alabama, United States
 WBIB-FM, a radio station (89.1 FM) licensed to serve Forsyth, Georgia, United States
 DTDP-L-rhamnose 4-epimerase, an enzyme